Pugionium is a genus of flowering plants belonging to the family Brassicaceae.

Its native range is Southwestern Siberia to Northern China.

Species:

Pugionium cornutum 
Pugionium dolabratum 
Pugionium pterocarpum

References

Brassicaceae
Brassicaceae genera